Robert Vernon Lee, III is an American Episcopal priest and is chairman and CEO of Jacksonville, Florida-based nonprofit FreshMinistries and its international arm, Be The Change International.  Lee is responsible for a number of initiatives and partnerships addressing issues of poverty worldwide.  In the United States, efforts began with programs vital to the restoration of core-city Jacksonville.  He has also spearheaded partnerships in Africa designed to combat HIV/AIDS and to address the United Nations Millennium Development Goals.

Biography
Robert Vernon Lee, III, was born on January 14, 1951, in El Paso, Texas, to Colonel Robert V. Lee, Jr. and Cynthia Warren Lee.

He earned his bachelor's degree from Vanderbilt University and continued graduate studies in journalism at the University of Georgia. He earned a master of divinity from Yale University and a doctorate of theology from New York Theological Seminary.

After serving as rector of Church of Our Saviour in Jacksonville, Florida, Dr. Lee founded FreshMinistries in 1988, which was incorporated as a 501(c)(3) the following year. FreshMinistries became Lee's full-time ministry in 1994, with goals of interfaith and interracial outreach.

He is currently serving as a non-stipendiary Canon for Outreach and Ecumenism in the Diocese of Florida, he's also served parishes in Connecticut and Florida.

He has served as the Chairman of the Interfaith Sub-Committee of the 2005 Super Bowl Host Committee in Jacksonville and as a director for: St. Mary's Outreach Ministry in Jacksonville, the Samaritan Center, Dignity-U-Wear, Christian Healing Ministries, and the Florida Council of Churches.
 
By appointment of Governor Jeb Bush, Lee currently serves as a member of the Governor's Faith-based Advisory Board for the state of Florida.

As a mayoral appointee he also serves on the Mayor's Faith-based and Community Advisory Board for the city of Jacksonville. Lee is also the first head of a not-for-profit organization to serve as a Director on the Board of the Jacksonville Regional Chamber of Commerce.

He also serves on the board of directors for the Jacksonville Interfaith Council, Habitat for Humanity of Jacksonville (HabiJax), and the Jacksonville Urban League. He is also a member of the Compass Rose Society, an organization of the Anglican Communion serving the Archbishop of Canterbury.
 
By appointment of Queen Elizabeth II, Lee has also been inducted into the Order of St. John of Jerusalem.
 
Lee was appointed by President George W. Bush and continues to serve under President Barack Obama as a key member of the inaugural President's Council On Financial Literacy.

He currently resides in Jacksonville, Florida with his wife, Mirte de Boer Lee, and his two children.

International Partnerships
Lee has been involved with several international partnerships through his FreshMinistries projects.

Siyafundisa
In 2004, FreshMinistries received a 5-year, $10 million USAID grant for HIV/AIDS education in South Africa, Mozambique and Namibia. Lee helped initiate a partnership between FreshMinistries and the Church of the Province of Southern Africa to utilize the Anglican Church's presence and existing infrastructure to administer peer-based HIV/AIDS prevention programs.  Siyafundisa had a 2009 annual target reach of 32,340 youth.

Global Action Partnership
In 2009, The Anglican Communion approached Lee about bringing worldwide the 6-Point Community Initiative, a holistic approach to community improvement that has been successful in Jacksonville, FL. Lee began talks with Hellen Wangusa, Anglican Observer at the United Nations; and Olara Otunnu, president of the LBL Foundation for Children, about creating a Global Action Partnership (GAP) that would address all of the United Nation's Millennium Development Goals at once, the first program of its kind.  In November 2009, GAP was signed into existence in New York City.
 
The creation of GAP was given a boost within the Anglican community by receiving the approval and support of the Archbishop of Canterbury,  Rowan Williams, at a dinner during the Episcopal Church's General Convention in 2009.

Response to 2010 Haiti earthquake
In response to the devastating  2010 Haiti earthquake, FreshMinistries/Be The Change International (BTCI) was asked by the US Department of Health and Human Services to coordinate a major aid and relief operation there, which led to Lee's development of the "Tomorrow's Haiti" initiative.  "Tomorrow’s Haiti" will create initiatives in Haiti that will simultaneously address education, economic development, health, safety, safe shelter and clean water, and family foundations.  The program will be the first of its kind, addressing all of the UN's Millennium Development Goals at once, modeled on FreshMinistries’ HIV/AIDS education program in South Africa, Siyafundisa, as well as BCTI's thriving holistic approach to creating long-term sustainable change in inner-city Jacksonville.

Currently, the program is using the Episcopal churches and 254 schools within BAEH's network as community centers from which to distribute relief aid to the Haitian people and introduce the community to the “Tomorrow’s Haiti” empowerment plan.

BTCI's emergency relief effort has shipped many supplies to the Haitian people, including three ambulances (one of which was delivered to the Haitian government), emergency aid, food, water, water purification systems, clothing, school supplies, large generators, and 147 large tents to serve as temporary schools and shelter.  BTCI plans to ship more than 100 additional large tents to serve as schools and shelter, as well as medical equipment such as surgical beds.

Revitalization in Jacksonville
In 2006, Lee was named a "Change Agent" by the Florida Times-Union for creating FreshMinistries, "helping people start businesses, revitalize their neighborhoods and get out of debt."

6-Point Community Initiative
Lee created the concept of a holistic model for community revitalization that simultaneously addresses all areas of needed improvement at once.  For Jacksonville's Eastside, these areas are education, affordable housing, economic development, family strengthening, safety and health.
The initiative works in a number of ways, including focusing on partnerships with local, state and national organizations and government agencies.  At times, FreshMinistries becomes the lead agency in managing a project.  Other times, it is a partner with other agencies working toward similar goals.  Notable partners include former Florida Governor Jeb Bush, Jacksonville Mayor John Peyton, Duval County School Superintendent Ed Pratt-Dannals, and Jacksonville Sheriff John Rutherford.

A unique aspect of the initiative is that it works toward developing other programs, initiatives and improvements that will be self-sufficient and community-owned, constantly customizing and updating the needs based on what the community says it needs.  According to Dr. Lee:

Recognition
In August 2008, Lee and FreshMinistries Communities Empowering Youth (CEY) director, Michelle Hughes, were awarded for their work in the community by the Jacksonville Sheriff's Office (JSO).  This recognition, according to JSO, was for their neighborhood anti-crime walks, CEY's efforts in assisting the Police Athletic League (PAL), and the rest of FreshMinistries’ initiatives that focus on community improvement and safety.

Lee was responsible for spearheading a partnership between FreshMinistries and Florida State College at Jacksonville (FSCJ) to create a tuition-free, accelerated welding training program for Eastside neighborhood adults who are unemployed and underemployed.  The program's first cycle has successfully trained 25 adults, with all graduates of the program guaranteed jobs through Atlantic Marine as they become available.

In 2000, Lee delivered a sermon to President George W. Bush during his visit to Jacksonville, FL.  In the sermon he charged President Bush and world leaders to establish justice through compassion.

References

External links
FreshMinistries official website

Non-profit organizations based in Jacksonville, Florida
Community building
American Episcopal priests
Organizations established in 1994
Lee family of Virginia
1951 births
Living people
People from El Paso, Texas